Merriman is a village in Cherry County, Nebraska. The population was 128 at the time of the 2010 census.

History
Merriman was established in 1885 when the Fremont, Elkhorn and Missouri Valley Railroad was extended to that point. It was named for J. Merriman, a railroad official.

Demographics

2010 census
As of the census of 2010, there were 128 people, 58 households, and 36 families living in the village. The racial makeup of the village was 87.5% White, 1.6% African American, 6.3% Native American, and 4.7% from two or more races. Hispanic or Latino of any race were 0.8% of the population.

There were 58 households, of which 24.1% had children under the age of 18 living with them, 51.7% were married couples living together, 5.2% had a female householder with no husband present, 5.2% had a male householder with no wife present, and 37.9% were non-families. 34.5% of all households were made up of individuals, and 27.6% had someone living alone who was 65 years of age or older. The average household size was 2.21 and the average family size was 2.78.

The median age in the village was 51 years. 22.7% of residents were under the age of 18; 0.8% were between the ages of 18 and 24; 18.8% were from 25 to 44; 26.6% were from 45 to 64; and 31.3% were 65 years of age or older. The gender makeup of the village was 50.8% male and 49.2% female.

2000 census
At the 2000 census, there were 118 people, 51 households and 31 families living in the village. The population density was 115.0 per square mile (44.2/km). There were 69 housing units at an average density of 67.3 per square mile (25.9/km). The racial makeup of the village was 93.22% White, 3.39% Native American, and 3.39% from two or more races.

There were 51 households, of which 29.4% had children under the age of 18 living with them, 51.0% were married couples living together, 5.9% had a female householder with no husband present, and 39.2% were non-families. 35.3% of all households were made up of individuals, and 19.6% had someone living alone who was 65 years of age or older. The average household size was 2.31 and the average family size was 3.00.

27.1% of the population were under the age of 18, 5.1% from 18 to 24, 20.3% from 25 to 44, 25.4% from 45 to 64, and 22.0% who were 65 years of age or older. The median age was 42 years. For every 100 females, there were 93.4 males. For every 100 females age 18 and over, there were 95.5 males.

The median household income was $19,250 and the median family income was $23,750. Males had a median income of $21,875 compared with $13,750 for females. The per capita income for the village was $10,736. There were 26.7% of families and 30.1% of the population living below the poverty line, including 31.4% of under eighteens and 20.0% of those over 64.

Geography
Merriman is located at  (42.919127, -101.699972).

Climate
The area is characterized by humid continental climate which typically has a large seasonal temperature difference, with warm to hot (and often humid) summers and cold (sometimes severely cold) winters. Precipitation is relatively well distributed year-round in many areas with this climate, while others may see a marked reduction in wintry precipitation and even a wintertime drought. The Köppen Climate Classification subtype for this climate is "Dfa" (Hot Summer Continental Climate).

Notable people
Arthur Bowring, rancher and legislator
Eva Bowring, member of the United States Senate in 1954
Val Logsdon Fitch, physicist and Nobel Prize laureate

References

Villages in Cherry County, Nebraska
Villages in Nebraska
Populated places established in 1885
1885 establishments in Nebraska